Judy Seeberger is an American politician representing District 41 in the Minnesota Senate since 2023. 

Seeberger is a public school teacher and lawyer. She was a paramedic and fire department employee. During the 2022 Minnesota Senate election, she campaigned on supporting first responders, including investments in mental health and crime prevention. Seeberger also advertised supporting certain tax cuts, abortion access rights, red flag laws, and new paid family and medical leave programs.

Electoral history

References 

Living people
Year of birth missing (living people)
Place of birth missing (living people)
Democratic Party Minnesota state senators
Women state legislators in Minnesota
21st-century American women politicians
21st-century American women educators
21st-century American educators
Schoolteachers from Minnesota
21st-century American women lawyers
21st-century American lawyers
Minnesota lawyers
Paramedics